Hilal Başkol (born 10 January 1995) is a Turkish women's football  attacking midfielder, who last played in the First League for Konak Belediyespor with jersey number 13. She was a member of the Turkey women's national U-19 team in 2013.

Early  years
Hilal Başkol was born in Amasya, northern Turkey, on 10 January 1995. She grew up and was schooled in her hometown. In the school, she participated for some time in a basketball course, was though much more interested in football playing. Her teacher for physical education influenced her to join the newly formed girls' football team of the school. She enjoyed Turkish champion title with the school team.

She was called up to the qualifications for the Turkey girls' national under-15 football team, where she was spotted by the coach of Gölcükspor women's football team, who wanted to transfer her. Since there existed no league-playing women's football team in Amasya, she accepted, in agreement with her parents, to move to Gölcük, Kocaeli, although pretty far for a young girl.

Playing career
Her position on the field is attacking midfielder.

Club

Hilal Başkol received her license on 22 October 2009 and began playing for Gölcükspor in the Women's Second League. After one season, her team was promoted to the Turkish Women's First League. Başkol played two seasons with Gölcükspor, capped 39 times and scored 21 goals. In the 2011–12 season, she transferred to Derince Belediyespor in the same province, however to play in the Second League again. At the end of the season, her team was promoted to the First League. There she was part two seasons, capping in 27 matches and netting 16 times.

In July 2013, she transferred from Derince Belediyespor, where she was known as the "super scorer", to Konak Belediyespor in Izmir.

She played at the 2015–16 UEFA Women's Champions League qualifying round matches and scored the only goal of her team in the match against FC Minsk. She scored her team's second goal at the 2015–16 UEFA Women's Champions League qualifying round match against Hibernians F.C. that ended 5–0 for Konak Belediyespor.

International
Hilal Başkol became international playing for the Turkey girls' national U-15 team in the 2010 Summer Youth Olympics qualifying round match against Georgia on 12 October 2009, at which she scored also her first international goal. She took part then in the 2010 Summer Youth Olympics – Girls' tournament matches scoring three more goals for the Turkey U-15 team.

With the Turkey U-17 team, she participated at the 2012 UEFA Women's Under-17 Championship qualification#Group 7 matches, and scored her first goal for the U-17 team in the match against the Greek junior women on 1 October 2011. She has two goals in 8 games with the Turkey U-17 team.

She debuted for the Turkey U-19 team in the friendly match against Russia on 18 February 2012. Başkol took part at the 2014 UEFA Women's Under-19 Championship First qualifying round – Group 10 matches. She capped in total 11 times and scored 2 goals.

In 2014, she debuted in the Turkey women's U-21 team's friendly match against Belgium, and scored a goal.

She played her only once in the Turkey women's national team at the UEFA Women's Euro 2017 qualifying Group 5 match against Croatia in 2015.

Career statistics
.

Honours
 Turkish Women's First Football League
 Konak Belediyespor
 Winners (4): 2013–14, 2014–15, 2015–16, 2016–17

References

External links

 

1995 births
People from Amasya
Turkish women's footballers
Gölcükspor players
Derince Belediyespor women's players
Konak Belediyespor players
Living people
Footballers at the 2010 Summer Youth Olympics
Turkey women's international footballers
Women's association football midfielders
21st-century Turkish sportswomen